Contemporary Pragmatism is a quarterly peer-reviewed academic journal covering discussions of applying pragmatism, broadly understood, to today's issues. The journal was established in 2004 and was published by Rodopi Publishers. The editor-in-chief is John R. Shook (Center for Inquiry Transnational) and Maria Baghramian. The journal is affiliated with the International Pragmatism Society.

It is now published by Brill Publishers.

External links

21st-century philosophy
Analytic philosophy literature
Philosophy journals
Pragmatism
Quarterly journals
Brill Publishers academic journals
Publications established in 2004